Miharja is a town located in Kuala Lumpur. It can be accessed through the Rapid KL - Star LRT Line at Miharja station & Maluri station on the Ampang Line. 

Suburbs in Kuala Lumpur